In Malaysia, the Emergency Ordinance (abbreviated EO) is used and enacted following a Proclamation of Emergency that has been issued by the Yang di-Pertuan Agong (as the Malaysian head of state) under Articles 150 of the Constitution.

List of Emergency Ordinance

References

Malaysian legislation